Two human polls comprised the 1965 NCAA University Division football rankings. Unlike most sports, college football's governing body, the NCAA, does not bestow a national championship, instead that title is bestowed by one or more different polling agencies. There are two main weekly polls that begin in the preseason—the AP Poll and the Coaches Poll.

Legend

AP Poll
For the first time in its history, the final AP Poll was released in January, after the bowl games. This practice would not be repeated again for the next two seasons, but has been the standard since the 1968 season.

The AP Poll ranked only the top ten teams from 1962 through 1967. Entering New Year's Day, the top three teams (Michigan State, Arkansas, Nebraska) were all 10–0, but all three lost.

Final Coaches Poll
The final UPI Coaches Poll was released prior to the bowl games, in late November.Michigan State received 28 of the 35 first-place votes; Arkansas received five and Nebraska two.

Notre Dame did not participate in bowl games from 1925 through 1968.
 Prior to the 1975 season, the Big Ten and Pac-8 conferences allowed only one postseason participant each, for the Rose Bowl.
 The Ivy League has prohibited its members from participating in postseason football since the league was officially formed in 1954.

References

College football rankings